van Wieren is a surname. Notable people with the surname include:

Larry van Wieren (born 1951), Dutch ice hockey player
Pete Van Wieren (1944–2014), American sportscaster

See also
Van Dieren (surname)

Surnames of Dutch origin